Elections to Trafford Council were held on Thursday, 1 May 1975. One third of the council was up for election, with each successful candidate to serve a four-year term of office, expiring in 1979. These were the first Borough elections to be held in Trafford since it received its Royal Charter (and effectively took over from its predecessor Districts and Municipal Boroughs) in 1974. The Conservative Party retained overall control of the council.

After the election, the composition of the council was as follows:

Ward results

References

1975 English local elections
1975
1970s in Greater Manchester